Enasidenib (INN; trade name Idhifa) is a medication used to treat relapsed or refractory acute myeloid leukemia in people with specific mutations of the isocitrate dehydrogenase 2 (IDH2) gene, determined by an FDA-approved IDH2 companion diagnostic test. It is an inhibitor of IDH2. It was developed by Agios Pharmaceuticals and is licensed to Celgene for further development.

The U.S. Food and Drug Administration (FDA) considers it to be a first-in-class medication.

Medical use
Enasidenib is used to treat relapsed or refractory acute myeloid leukemia in people with specific mutations of the IDH2 gene, determined by an FDA-approved IDH2 companion diagnostic test.

Adverse effects
The main serious adverse effect of enasidenib is differentiation syndrome.

Pharmacology 
Isocitrate dehydrogenase is a critical enzyme in the citric acid cycle. Mutated forms of IDH produce high levels of the (R)-enantiomer of 2-hydroxyglutarate (R-2-HG) and can contribute to the growth of tumors. IDH1 catalyzes this reaction in the cytoplasm, while IDH2 catalyzes this reaction in mitochondria. Mutations of IDH2 are more common than IDH1 mutations, 8 to 19% compared to 7 to 14% respectively, in those affected with AML. Enasidenib disrupts this cycle by decreasing total (R)-2-HG levels in the mitochondria.

History 
The U.S. Food and Drug Administration (FDA) granted the application for enasidenib fast track designation and orphan drug designation for acute myeloid leukemia in 2014. 

Enasidenib was approved by the FDA in August 2017, for relapsed or refractory acute myeloid leukemia (AML) in people with specific mutations of the IDH2 gene, determined by an FDA-approved IDH2 companion diagnostic test.

References

External links 
 
 
 

Antineoplastic drugs
Bristol Myers Squibb
Orphan drugs
Pyridines
Triazines
Trifluoromethyl compounds